Rhinelander can refer to a person from Rhineland, Germany.

Rhinelander can also refer to:

Places
 Rhinelander, Wisconsin, a city in the United States
 Rhinelander-Oneida County Airport, an airport that serves Rhinelander, Wisconsin, USA
 Rhinelander High School, a school that serves Rhinelander, Wisconsin, USA
 Rhinelander Brewing Company, a craft brewery located in Rhinelander, Wisconsin, USA

Animals
 Rhenish Warmblood or Rhineländer, a German breed of warmblood horse
 Rhinelander rabbit, a German breed of rabbit

Structures
 Rhinelander Mansion in New York City, USA

People
 Frederic W. Rhinelander (1828–1904), an American who served as president of the Metropolitan Museum of Art.
 Gertrude Rhinelander Waldo (1842–1914), an American heiress
 Thomas Jackson Oakley Rhinelander (1858–1946), an American real estate magnate and society leader
 Philip M. Rhinelander (1869–1939), bishop of the Episcopal Diocese of Pennsylvania
 Edith Cruger Sands Rhinelander (1874–1923), an American socialite 
 Rhinelander Waldo (1877–1927), an early 20th-century American fire commissioner, then police commissioner, of New York City, USA
 Anita Rhinelander Stewart (later Princess Miguel of Braganza) (1886–1977), an American socialite and heiress 
 Kip Rhinelander (1903 – 1936), an American socialite in New York City who was the subject of a divorce process (1925) notable for the contemporary discussion of racial issues and for the use of (ethical) photomanipulation in journalism
 Philip H. Rhinelander (1908–1987), philosopher at Stanford University

See also
Rhineland (disambiguation)